The St. Mary River Formation is a geologic formation of Late Cretaceous (71.9-67 Ma) age of the Western Canada Sedimentary Basin in southwestern Alberta and northwesternmost Montana. It was first described from outcrops along the St. Mary River by George Mercer Dawson in 1883, and it takes its name from the river.

Fossils from the formation include remains of dinosaurs, as well as bivalve shells, plant fossils, and trace fossils.

Lithology 
The St. Mary River Formation is generally considered to consist of two units. The lower  of the formation was deposited in brackish water environments, and is characterized by fine-grained sandstones, grey shales, coquinoid beds, carbonaceous mudstones and coal beds. The remainder of the formation was deposited in freshwater fluvial and floodplain environments and is characterized by interbedded sandstone and siltstone, with minor occurrences of carbonaceous shale and coal.

Thickness and distribution 
The St. Mary River Formation is part of an eastward-thinning wedge of sediments derived from the erosion of the mountains to the west.

Relationship to other units 
The St. Mary River Formation conformably overlies the Blood Reserve Sandstone, or the Bearpaw Formation where the Blood Reserve Sandstone is absent, and it is conformably overlain by the Willow Creek Formation. It extends from Glacier County, Montana to as far north as the Little Bow River in Alberta, where it grades into and intertongues with the contemporaneous strata of the Horseshoe Canyon Formation.

Fossil content

Flora 
Eighteen species of plant leaves were described from the St. Mary River Formation in 1949. More recent work downstream from the St. Mary Reservoir increased the total to at least 32 species. The assemblage includes remains of ferns, Ginkgo, conifers, a Trapa-like plant, and at least six types of large monocot leaves in addition to a sabaloid palm.

Molluscs 
Beds of Ostrea and Corbicula shells are common in the basal, brackish water portion of the formation. The overlying freshwater beds include shells of freshwater and terrestrial molluscs. Shells of unionid freshwater mussels are common in the fluvial sandstones.

Mammals 
The mammals of the St. Mary River Formation were described by Sloan and Russell in 1974.

Dinosaurs

Dinosaur tracks 
The St. Mary River Formation has produced relatively few dinosaur fossils from its outcrops in southwestern Alberta. However, footprints and trackways have been found along the St. Mary and Oldman Rivers. One footprint from the formation includes the first record of skin impressions from the bottom of a hadrosaur foot.

Ornithischians

Theropods

See also 
 List of dinosaur-bearing rock formations

References 

Stratigraphy of Alberta
Cretaceous Montana
Cretaceous Alberta
Campanian Stage
Maastrichtian Stage of North America
Sandstone formations of Canada
Sandstone formations of the United States
Ichnofossiliferous formations